Sicana is a small genus of flowering plants in the family Cucurbitaceae. There are three or four species, found in rainforest and secondary scrub in the Caribbean and Central America.

Species
According to Hanno Schaefer and Susanne Renner, there are four species in the genus. , The Plant List gave only three accepted species:
Sicana odorifera (Vell.) Naudin
Sicana sphaerica Hook.
Sicana trinitensis Cheesman

References

Cucurbitaceae genera
Cucurbitoideae
Flora of Central America
Flora of the Caribbean